Piperovo may refer to:
 Piperovo, Kyustendil Province, Bulgaria
 Piperovo, North Macedonia